The Jamia Masjid, Nathowal is situated in Nathowal of the Ludhiana district in the Indian State of Punjab.

Location
The mosque is situated in Nathowal about 12 km from Raikot, 54 km from Ludhiana and 151 km from the capital city of Chandigarh.

History
In the 1947, Partition of India, 10 to 12 Muslim families of this village migrated to Pakistan but 50 families stayed back with the Sikh, who didn't allow them to leave. At that time they built a mosque for worship. Now Nathowal has a population of around 7,000, of which approximately 500 are Muslims.

Reconstruction
Muslims, Hindus and Sikhs have contributed to the repair of the mosque. Of the Rs2.5 million invested in the project, around Rs1.5 million have been contributed by Sikhs and Hindus.

References

Mosques in Punjab, India
Buildings and structures in Ludhiana